Love in the Buff is a 2012 Hong Kong romantic comedy film directed by Pang Ho-cheung and starring Miriam Yeung and Shawn Yue.  It is the sequel to the 2010 film Love in a Puff (film).

Principal photography began in mid-July 2011 at Hong Kong and was later moved to Beijing in early August, before finally wrapping up 30 August 2011. The film was released on 29 March 2012 in Hong Kong. The film won the Audience Award in the competition section of the Osaka Asian Film Festival in 2013.

For her performance in the film, Miriam Yeung won the Best Actress award at the 32nd Hong Kong Film Awards.

A third installment, Love Off the Cuff, was released on April 27, 2017.

Plot
Five months after the events in Love in a Puff, Jimmy and Cherie are currently living together. Jimmy is under much stress, working long hours. His previous boss, now working in Beijing, asks him to move there to work for him. Jimmy's commitment to his job and the decision to move to Beijing cause a rift in his relationship with Cherie. Eventually, they break up and he moves to Beijing.

On one of his business trips, he meets a flight attendant, You-you Shang, and they develop a romantic relationship.

Six months later, Cherie is also transferred to Beijing by her company. The two meet by chance but at this time, Cherie is also seeing a responsible and down-to-earth businessman, Sam. Jimmy and Cherie start to cheat behind Sam's and You-you's backs.  Initially, they both have a good time going on a few dates, but soon Cherie wants more than the status quo. She breaks it off with Jimmy a second time.  This time however, Jimmy decides to end his relationship with You-You and tries to win back Cherie, and in the end, succeeds.

Cast
Miriam Yeung as Cherie Yu
Shawn Yue as Jimmy Cheung
Yang Mi as Youyou Shang
Xu Zheng as Sam
Vincent Kok as Jimmy's colleague
Roy Szeto as Jimmy's colleague
Crystal Tin as Cherie's boss
Ekin Cheng as himself (cameo)
Linda Wong as herself (cameo)
Huang Xiaoming as "man who looks like Huang Xiaoming" (cameo)
Hao Lei (cameo)
Yat Ning Chan as Isabel

Reception
As of 3 April 2012, Love in the Buff has scored an 89% "Fresh" rating on Rotten Tomatoes.

Box office
After 4 days of its initial release in Hong Kong, the film has earned HK$9,301,112 in the box office and was no. 1 on the weekend of 31 March to 1 April at the Hong Kong box office.

Closing Credits
Shawn Yue's re-enactment of Linda Wong's '90s hit song "Don't Ask Who I Am" was shown along with the closing credits.  In the video, Yue dressed very closely as Wong, as well as mimicked Wong's facial expressions and gestures in the original video. This video has gone viral on social networking sites.

Soundtrack album
A Love in the Buff original soundtrack was released on 30 March 2012.

Track listing:
 法國人惹的禍
 Drenched (唱-曲婉婷)
 Water Melon Bossa
 Chop Pig Chair
 離開好地方
 好地方（北京版）
 Rendezvous Valse
 我的歌聲裡 (唱-曲婉婷)
 Anyway At All
 Smoky Memory
 He Said You Are Beautiful
 Date In Bed
 Queen Of Hea
 What's Behind
 Third Party
 Flirt Again
 Blind Date Club
 Who's 余春嬌?
 To Be Honest
 草坪，野餐，好舒服
 春天
 Transparent Secret (EKIN version)
 Mirror Of You
 Why Couldn't Be Together Everyday?
 Time To Leave, Bye!
 Time To Chase You Back
 掛住你呀！
 Love Means...
 Love In The Buff

References

External links 
 
 
 Hong Kong Film Mart

2012 films
2010s Cantonese-language films
Hong Kong romantic comedy films
2012 romantic comedy films
Media Asia films
Hong Kong sequel films
Films directed by Pang Ho-cheung
Films set in Hong Kong
Films set in Beijing
Films shot in Hong Kong
Films shot in Beijing
2010s Hong Kong films